A transit of Venus across the Sun takes place when the planet Venus passes directly between the Sun and a superior planet, becoming visible against (and hence obscuring a small portion of) the solar disk. During a transit, Venus can be seen from Earth as a small black dot moving across the face of the Sun. The duration of such transits is usually several hours (the transit of 2012 lasted 6 hours and 40 minutes). A transit is similar to a solar eclipse by the Moon. While the diameter of Venus is more than three times that of the Moon, Venus appears smaller, and travels more slowly across the face of the Sun, because it is much farther away from Earth.

Transits of Venus are among the rarest of predictable astronomical phenomena. They occur in a pattern that generally repeats every 243 years, with pairs of transits eight years apart separated by long gaps of 121.5 years and 105.5 years. The periodicity is a reflection of the fact that the orbital periods of Earth and Venus are close to 8:13 and 243:395 commensurabilities.

The last transit of Venus was on 5 and 6 June 2012, and was the last Venus transit of the 21st century; the prior transit took place on 8 June 2004. The previous pair of transits were in December 1874 and December 1882. The next transits of Venus will take place on 10–11 December 2117 and 8 December 2125.

Venus transits are historically of great scientific importance as they were used to gain the first realistic estimates of the size of the Solar System. Observations of the 1639 transit provided an estimate of both the size of Venus and the distance between the Sun and the Earth that was more accurate than any other up to that time. Observational data from subsequent predicted transits in 1761 and 1769 further improved the accuracy of this initial estimated distance through the use of the principle of parallax. The 2012 transit provided scientists with a number of other research opportunities, particularly in the refinement of techniques to be used in the search for exoplanets.

Conjunctions 

Venus, with an orbit inclined by 3.4° relative to the Earth's, usually appears to pass under (or over) the Sun at inferior conjunction. A transit occurs when Venus reaches conjunction with the Sun at or near one of its nodes—the longitude where Venus passes through the Earth's orbital plane (the ecliptic)—and appears to pass directly across the Sun. Although the inclination between these two orbital planes is only 3.4°, Venus can be as far as 9.6° from the Sun when viewed from the Earth at inferior conjunction. Since the angular diameter of the Sun is about half a degree, Venus may appear to pass above or below the Sun by more than 18 solar diameters during an ordinary conjunction.

Sequences of transits usually repeat every 243 years. After this period of time Venus and Earth have returned to very nearly the same point in their respective orbits. During the Earth's 243 sidereal orbital periods, which total 88,757.3 days, Venus completes 395 sidereal orbital periods of 224.701 days each, equal to 88,756.9 Earth days. This period of time corresponds to 152 synodic periods of Venus.

The pattern of 105.5, 8, 121.5 and 8 years is not the only pattern that is possible within the 243-year cycle, because of the slight mismatch between the times when the Earth and Venus arrive at the point of conjunction. Prior to 1518, the pattern of transits was 8, 113.5 and 121.5 years, and the eight inter-transit gaps before the AD 546 transit were 121.5 years apart. The current pattern will continue until 2846, when it will be replaced by a pattern of 105.5, 129.5 and 8 years. Thus, the 243-year cycle is relatively stable, but the number of transits and their timing within the cycle will vary over time. Since the 243:395 Earth:Venus commensurability is only approximate, there are different sequences of transits occurring 243 years apart, each extending for several thousand years, which are eventually replaced by other sequences. For instance, there is a series which ended in 541 BC, and the series which includes 2117 only started in AD 1631.

History of observation

Ancient and medieval history 
Ancient Indian, Greek, Egyptian, Babylonian and Chinese observers knew of Venus and recorded the planet's motions. The early Greek astronomers called Venus by two names—Hesperus the evening star and Phosphorus the morning star. Pythagoras is credited with realizing they were the same planet. There is no evidence that any of these cultures knew of the transits. Venus was important to ancient American civilizations, in particular for the Maya, who called it Noh Ek, "the Great Star" or Xux Ek, "the Wasp Star"; they embodied Venus in the form of the god Kukulkán (also known as or related to Gukumatz and Quetzalcoatl in other parts of Mexico). In the Dresden Codex, the Maya charted Venus's full cycle, but despite their precise knowledge of its course, there is no mention of a transit. However, it has been proposed that frescoes found at Mayapan may contain a pictorial representation of the 12th or 13th century transits.

The Persian polymath Avicenna claimed to have observed Venus as a spot on the Sun. This is possible, as there was a transit on 24 May 1032, but Avicenna did not give the date of his observation, and modern scholars have questioned whether he could have observed the transit from his location at that time; he may have mistaken a sunspot for Venus. He used his transit observation to help establish that Venus was, at least sometimes, below the Sun in Ptolemaic cosmology, i.e. the sphere of Venus comes before the sphere of the Sun when moving out from the Earth in the prevailing geocentric model.

1639first scientific observation 

In 1627, Johannes Kepler became the first person to predict a transit of Venus, by predicting the 1631 event. His methods were not sufficiently accurate to predict that the transit would not be visible in most of Europe, and as a consequence, nobody was able to use his prediction to observe the phenomenon.

The first recorded observation of a transit of Venus was made by Jeremiah Horrocks from his home at Carr House in Much Hoole, near Preston in England, on 4 December 1639 (24 November under the Julian calendar then in use in England). His friend, William Crabtree, also observed this transit from Broughton, near Manchester. Kepler had predicted transits in 1631 and 1761 and a near miss in 1639. Horrocks corrected Kepler's calculation for the orbit of Venus, realized that transits of Venus would occur in pairs 8 years apart, and so predicted the transit of 1639. Although he was uncertain of the exact time, he calculated that the transit was to begin at approximately 15:00. Horrocks focused the image of the Sun through a simple telescope onto a piece of paper, where the image could be safely observed. After observing for most of the day, he was lucky to see the transit as clouds obscuring the Sun cleared at about 15:15, just half an hour before sunset. Horrocks's observations allowed him to make a well-informed guess as to the size of Venus, as well as to make an estimate of the mean distance between the Earth and the Sunthe astronomical unit (AU). The observations were not published until 1661, well after Horrocks's death. Horrocks based his calculation on the (false) presumption that each planet's size was proportional to its rank from the Sun, not on the parallax effect as used by the 1761 and 1769 and following experiments.

1761 and 1769 

In 1663 Scottish mathematician James Gregory had suggested in his Optica Promota that observations of a transit of the planet Mercury, at widely spaced points on the surface of the Earth, could be used to calculate the solar parallax and hence the astronomical unit using triangulation. Aware of this, a young Edmond Halley made observations of such a transit on 28 October O.S. 1677 from Saint Helena but was disappointed to find that only Richard Towneley in Burnley, Lancashire had made another accurate observation of the event whilst Gallet, at Avignon, simply recorded that it had occurred. Halley was not satisfied that the resulting calculation of the solar parallax at 45" was accurate.

In a paper published in 1691, and a more refined one in 1716, he proposed that more accurate calculations could be made using measurements of a transit of Venus, although the next such event was not due until 1761 (6 June N.S., 26 May O.S.). Halley died in 1742, but in 1761 numerous expeditions were made to various parts of the world so that precise observations of the transit could be made in order to make the calculations as described by Halley—an early example of international scientific collaboration. This collaboration was, however, underpinned by competition, the British, for example, being spurred to action only after they heard of French plans from Joseph-Nicolas Delisle. In an attempt to observe the first transit of the pair, astronomers from Britain (William Wales and Captain James Cook), Austria (Maximilian Hell) and France (Jean-Baptiste Chappe d'Auteroche and Guillaume Le Gentil) traveled to destinations around the world, including Siberia, Newfoundland and Madagascar. Most managed to observe at least part of the transit, particularly successful observations were made by Jeremiah Dixon and Charles Mason at the Cape of Good Hope. Less successful, at Saint Helena, were Nevil Maskelyne and Robert Waddington, although they put the voyage to good use by trialling the lunar-distance method of finding longitude.

That Venus might have an atmosphere was widely expected (because of the plurality of worlds belief) even before the transit of 1761.  However, few if any seem to have predicted that it might be possible to actually detect it during the transit.  The actual discovery of the atmosphere on Venus has long been attributed to the Russian Academician Mikhail Lomonosov on the basis of his observation of the transit of Venus of 1761 from the Imperial Academy of Sciences of St. Petersburg. At least in the English-speaking world, this attribution seems to have been owing to comments from the multi-lingual popular astronomy writer Willy Ley (1966), who consulted sources in both Russian and German, and wrote that Lomonosov observed a luminous ring (this was Ley's interpretation and was not indicated in quotes) and inferred from it the existence of an atmosphere "maybe greater than that of the Earth" (which was in quotes). Because many modern transit observers have also seen a threadlike arc produced by refraction of sunlight in the atmosphere of Venus when the planet has progressed off the limb of the Sun, it has generally, if rather uncritically, been assumed that this was the same thing that Lomonosov saw.  Indeed, the term "Lomonosov’s arc" has frequently been used in the literature. 

In 2012, Pasachoff and Sheehan consulted original sources, and questioned the basis for the claim that Lomonosov observed the thin arc produced by the atmosphere of Venus. A reference to the paper was even picked up by the Russian state-controlled media group RIA Novosti on 31 January 2013, under the headline "Astronomical Battle in US Over Lomonosov’s discovery." An attempt was made by a group of researchers to experimentally reconstruct Lomonosov's observation using antique telescopes during the transit of Venus on 5–6 June 2012.  One of them, Y. Petrunin, suggested that the telescope Lomonosov actually used was probably a 50 mm Dolland with a magnifying power of 40x. It was preserved at Pulkova Observatory but destroyed when the Germans bombed the observatory during World War II. Thus, Lomonosov's actual telescope was not available, but other presumably similar instruments were employed on this occasion, and led the researchers to affirm their belief that Lomonosov's telescope would have been adequate to the task of detecting the arc. Thus A. Koukarine, using a 67 mm Dollond on Mt. Hamilton, where seeing was likely much better than Lomonosov enjoyed at St. Petersburg, clearly observed the spiderweb-thin arc known to be due to refraction in the atmosphere of Venus. However, Koukarine's sketches do not really resemble the diagram published by Lomonosov. On the other hand, Koukarine's colleague V. Shiltsev, who more nearly observed under the same conditions as Lomonosov (using a 40 mm Dollond at Batavia, Illinois), did produce a close duplicate of Lomonosov's diagram; however, the rather large wing of light shown next to the black disk of Venus in his drawing (and Lomonosov's) is too coarse to have been the arc.  Instead it appears to be a complicated manifestation of the celebrated optical effect known as the "black drop".  (It should be kept in mind that, as stated in Sheehan and Westfall, "optical distortions at the interface between Venus and the Sun during transits are impressively large, and any inferences from them are fraught with peril".

Again, the actual words used by Lomonosov do not refer to an "arc" at all.  In the Russian version, he described a brief brightening lasting a second or so, just before third contact, which appeared to Pasachoff and Sheehan to most probably indicate a last fleeting glimpse of the photosphere.  As a check against this, Lomonosov's German version (he had learned to speak and write German fluently as a student at Marburg) was also consulted; he describes seeing "ein ganz helles Licht, wie ein Haar breit"=”a very bright light, as wide as a hair".  Here, the adverb "ganz" in connection with "helles" (bright) could mean "as bright as possible" or "completely bright"), i.e., as bright as the surface brightness of the solar disk, which is even stronger evidence that this can't be Venus's atmosphere, which always appears much fainter.  Lomonosov's original sketches, if they existed, do not appear to have survived, Modern observations made during the nineteenth century transits and especially those of 2004 and 2012 suggest that what Lomonosov saw was not the arc associated with the atmosphere of Venus at all but the bright flash of the solar photosphere before third contact.  The first observers to record the actual arc associated with the atmosphere of Venus, in a form comporting with modern observations, appear to have been Chappe, Rittenhouse, Wayles and Dymond and several others at the transit in June 1769.

For the 1769 transit (taking place on 3–4 June N.S., 23 May O.S.), scientists traveled to Tahiti, Norway, and locations in North America including Canada, New England, and San José del Cabo (Baja California, then under Spanish control). The Czech astronomer Christian Mayer was invited by Catherine the Great to observe the transit in Saint Petersburg with Anders Johan Lexell, while other members of the Russian Academy of Sciences went to eight other locations in the Russian Empire, under the general coordination of Stepan Rumovsky. George III of the United Kingdom had the King's Observatory built near his summer residence at Richmond Lodge for him and his royal astronomer Stephen Demainbray to observe the transit. The Hungarian astronomer Maximilian Hell and his assistant János Sajnovics traveled to Vardø, Norway, delegated by Christian VII of Denmark. William Wales and Joseph Dymond made their observation in Hudson Bay, Canada, for the Royal Society. Observations were made by a number of groups in the British colonies in America. In Philadelphia, the American Philosophical Society erected three temporary observatories and appointed a committee, of which David Rittenhouse was the head.  Observations were made by a group led by Dr. Benjamin West in Providence, Rhode Island, and published in 1769. The results of the various observations in the American colonies were printed in the first volume of the American Philosophical Society's Transactions, published in 1771. Comparing the North American observations, William Smith published in 1771 a best value of the solar parallax of 8.48 to 8.49 arc-seconds, which corresponds to an Earth-Sun distance of 24,000 times the Earth's radius, about 3% different from the correct value.

Observations were also made from Tahiti by James Cook and Charles Green at a location still known as Point Venus. This occurred on the first voyage of James Cook, after which Cook explored New Zealand and Australia. This was one of five expeditions organised by the Royal Society and the Astronomer Royal Nevil Maskelyne.

Jean-Baptiste Chappe d'Auteroche went to San José del Cabo in what was then New Spain to observe the transit with two Spanish astronomers (Vicente de Doz and Salvador de Medina). For his trouble he died in an epidemic of yellow fever there shortly after completing his observations. Only 9 of 28 in the entire party returned home alive.

The unfortunate Guillaume Le Gentil spent over eight years travelling in an attempt to observe either of the transits. His unsuccessful journey led to him losing his wife and possessions and being declared dead (his efforts became the basis of the play Transit of Venus by Maureen Hunter) and a subsequent opera, though eventually he regained his seat in the French Academy and had a long marriage. Under the influence of the Royal Society Ruđer Bošković travelled to Istanbul, but arrived too late.

Unfortunately, it was impossible to time the exact moment of the start and end of the transit because of the phenomenon known as the "black drop effect". This effect was long thought to be due to Venus's thick atmosphere, and initially it was held to be the first real evidence that Venus had an atmosphere. However, recent studies demonstrate that it is an optical effect caused by the smearing of the image of Venus by turbulence in the Earth's atmosphere or imperfections in the viewing apparatus along with the extreme brightness variation at the edge (limb) of the Sun as the line-of-sight from Earth goes from opaque to transparent in a small angle.

In 1771, using the combined 1761 and 1769 transit data, the French astronomer Jérôme Lalande calculated the astronomical unit to have a value of 153 million kilometers (±1 million km). The precision was less than had been hoped for because of the black drop effect, but still a considerable improvement on Horrocks's calculations.

Maximilian Hell published the results of his expedition in 1770, in Copenhagen. Based on the results of his own expedition, and of Wales and Cook, in 1772 he presented another calculation of the astronomical unit: 151.7 million kilometers. Lalande queried the accuracy and authenticity of the Hell expedition, but later he retreated in an article of Journal des sçavans, in 1778.

1874 and 1882 

Transit observations in 1874 and 1882 allowed this value to be refined further. Three expeditions—from Germany, the United Kingdom and the United States—were sent to the Kerguelen Archipelago for the 1874 observations. The American astronomer Simon Newcomb combined the data from the last four transits, and he arrived at a value of about 149.59 million kilometers (±0.31 million kilometers). Modern techniques, such as the use of radio telemetry from space probes, and of radar measurements of the distances to planets and asteroids in the Solar System, have allowed a reasonably accurate value for the astronomical unit (AU) to be calculated to a precision of about ±30 meters. As a result, the need for parallax calculations has been superseded.

2004 and 2012 

A number of scientific organizations headed by the European Southern Observatory (ESO) organized a network of amateur astronomers and students to measure Earth's distance from the Sun during the transit. The participants' observations allowed a calculation of the astronomical unit (AU) of 149,608,708 km ± 11,835 km which had only a 0.007% difference to the accepted value.

There was a good deal of interest in the 2004 transit as scientists attempted to measure the pattern of light dimming as Venus blocked out some of the Sun's light, in order to refine techniques that they hope to use in searching for extrasolar planets. Current methods of looking for planets orbiting other stars only work for a few cases: planets that are very large (Jupiter-like, not Earth-like), whose gravity is strong enough to wobble the star sufficiently for us to detect changes in proper motion or Doppler shift changes in radial velocity; Jupiter or Neptune sized planets very close to their parent star whose transit causes changes in the luminosity of the star; or planets which pass in front of background stars with the planet-parent star separation comparable to the Einstein ring and cause gravitational microlensing. Measuring light intensity during the course of a transit, as the planet blocks out some of the light, is potentially much more sensitive, and might be used to find smaller planets. However, extremely precise measurement is needed: for example, the transit of Venus causes the amount of light received from the Sun to drop by a fraction of 0.001 (that is, to 99.9% of its nominal value), and the dimming produced by small extrasolar planets will be similarly tiny.

The 2012 transit provided scientists numerous research opportunities as well, in particular in regard to the study of exoplanets. Research of the 2012 Venus transit includes:
 Measuring dips in a star's brightness caused by a known planet transiting the Sun will help astronomers find exoplanets. Unlike the 2004 Venus transit, the 2012 transit occurred during an active phase of the 11-year activity cycle of the Sun, and it is likely to give astronomers practice in picking up a planet's signal around a "spotty" variable star.
 Measurements made of the apparent diameter of Venus during the transit, and comparison with its known diameter, will give scientists an idea of how to estimate exoplanet sizes.
 Observation made of the atmosphere of Venus simultaneously from Earth-based telescopes and from the Venus Express gives scientists a better opportunity to understand the intermediate level of Venus's atmosphere than is possible from either viewpoint alone. This will provide new information about the climate of the planet.
 Spectrographic data taken of the well-known atmosphere of Venus will be compared to studies of exoplanets whose atmospheres are thus far unknown.
 The Hubble Space Telescope, which cannot be pointed directly at the Sun, used the Moon as a mirror to study the light that had passed through the atmosphere of Venus in order to determine its composition. This will help to show whether a similar technique could be used to study exoplanets.

Past and future transits 
NASA maintains a catalog of Venus transits covering the period 2000 BC to 4000 AD. Currently, transits occur only in June or December (see table) and the occurrence of these events slowly drifts, becoming later in the year by about two days every 243-year cycle. Transits usually occur in pairs, on nearly the same date eight years apart. This is because the length of eight Earth years is almost the same as 13 years on Venus, so every eight years the planets are in roughly the same relative positions. This approximate conjunction usually results in a pair of transits, but it is not precise enough to produce a triplet, since Venus arrives 22 hours earlier each time. The last transit not to be part of a pair was in 1396. The next will be in 3089; in 2854 (the second of the 2846/2854 pair), although Venus will just miss the Sun as seen from the Earth's equator, a partial transit will be visible from some parts of the southern hemisphere.

Thus after 243 years the transits of Venus return. The 1874 transit is a member of the 243-year cycle #1. The 1882 transit is a member of #2. The 2004 transit is a member of #3 and the 2012 transit is a member of #4. The 2117 transit is a member of #1 and so on. However, the ascending node (December transits) of the orbit of Venus moves backwards after each 243 years so the transit of 2854 is the last member of series #3 instead of series #1. The descending node (June transits) moves forwards, so the transit of 3705 is the last member of #2.
From −125,000 till +125,000 there are only about ten 243-year series at both nodes regarding all the transits of Venus in this very long time-span, because both nodes of the orbit of Venus move back and forward in time as seen from the Earth.

Over longer periods of time, new series of transits will start and old series will end. Unlike the saros series for lunar eclipses, it is possible for a transit series to restart after a hiatus. The transit series also vary much more in length than the saros series.

Grazing and simultaneous transits 
Sometimes Venus only grazes the Sun during a transit. In this case it is possible that in some areas of the Earth a full transit can be seen while in other regions there is only a partial transit (no second or third contact). The last transit of this type was on 6 December 1631, and the next such transit will occur on 13 December 2611. It is also possible that a transit of Venus can be seen in some parts of the world as a partial transit, while in others Venus misses the Sun. Such a transit last occurred on 19 November 541 BC, and the next transit of this type will occur on 14 December 2854. These effects occur due to parallax, since the size of the Earth affords different points of view with slightly different lines of sight to Venus and the Sun. It can be demonstrated by closing an eye and holding a finger in front of a smaller more distant object; when the viewer opens the other eye and closes the first, the finger will no longer be in front of the object.

The simultaneous occurrence of a transit of Mercury and a transit of Venus does occur, but extremely infrequently. Such an event last occurred on 22 September 373,173 BC and will next occur on 26 July 69,163, and again on 29 March 224,508. The simultaneous occurrence of a solar eclipse and a transit of Venus is currently possible, but very rare. The next solar eclipse occurring during a transit of Venus will be on 5 April 15,232. The last time a solar eclipse occurred during a transit of Venus was on 1 November 15,607 BC. A few hours after the transit of 3–4 June 1769 there was a total solar eclipse, which was visible in Northern America, Europe, and Northern Asia.

See also 
 Aspects of Venus (astrology)
 Geodynamics of Venus
 Outline of Venus
 Venus zone

References

Further reading

External links

General
Venus Transits: Measuring the Solar System
Historical observations of the transit of Venus
Edmond Halley's 1716 paper describing how transits could be used to measure the Sun's distance, translated from Latin.
Chasing Venus: Observing the Transits of Venus, 1631–2004 (Smithsonian Libraries)

June 2012 transit
2012 Transit of Venus – International Astronomical Union
National Solar Observatory – Transit of Venus 5–6 June 2012
2012 Transit of Venus Live Webcast and chatroom with SEMS at UND live From Alaska

 
Venus
Stellar occultation
Articles containing video clips